King University is a private Presbyterian-affiliated university in Bristol, Tennessee. Founded in 1867, King is independently governed with covenant affiliations to the Presbyterian Church (USA) and the Evangelical Presbyterian Church (EPC).

History
In April 1866, the Holston Presbytery assembled at the old Pleasant Grove Church in Bristol, Tenn., to establish a Christian college. The first classes were offered in August 1867.

When the college outgrew its small campus, King's grandson Isaac Anderson donated land on a hillside east of Bristol and in 1917, the college moved to its present location.

In January 2013, King College announced that it would change its name to King University. The name change reflects the master's-level, comprehensive benchmark that King has reached in recent years.  Becoming a university was the natural unfolding of King's strategic plan, unveiled in 1998, to create an even broader mix of programs based on a university model. On June 1, 2013, King College officially became King University.

In December 2013, King University was granted a Level V designation by the Southern Association of Colleges and Schools Commission on Colleges (SACSCOC), after a two-year application and review process. As a result, King University began its first doctoral program, a Doctorate of Nursing Practice, in the Fall 2014.

Campus

All main buildings on campus are brick and of Georgian-style architecture. King University also has three additional Tennessee campuses located in Kingsport and Knoxville. There are 10 additional instructional locations across Southwest Virginia and Tennessee.

Accreditation and memberships
King University is accredited by the Commission on Colleges of the Southern Association of Colleges and Schools (SACSCOC)

King is a member of numerous associations, including the Appalachian College Association (ACA), the Tennessee Independent Colleges and Universities Association (TICUA) and the Council for Christian Colleges and Universities (CCCU).

Academics
King University offers more than 80 undergraduate majors, minors and pre-professional programs. Several professional studies programs are offered for working professionals and most programs are available in face-to-face and online formats. King also offers several graduate programs: Master of Social Work (MSW), Master of Business Administration (MBA), Master of Education (MEd), Master of Science in Nursing (MSN), and Doctor of Nursing Practice (DNP).

Schools
King University is organized into six schools:
College of Arts and Sciences
Peeke School of Christian Mission
The School of Health and Professional Sciences
The School of Business, Economics and Technology
The School of Education
The School of Nursing

Libraries
 E.W. King Library (main campus): The E.W. King library contains a collection of over 140,000 items and is located on the north side of the campus Oval.
 Kingsport Information Resource Center: This center serves the College's students who attend classes in Kingsport, TN, and the surrounding area.
 Knoxville Learning Center: This center serves the College's Adult and Graduate Studies (AGS) students who attend classes in Knoxville, TN, and the surrounding area.

Curriculum
The Core Curriculum of King University underwent its last major revision by the faculty during Spring 2009. The Core is composed of a Common Experience, four semester hours of courses that all tradition undergraduates must take at the college, and General Education, thirty-eight hours of courses that span the traditional liberal arts.

Experience DC
As part of the University's First Year Experience Program, each year the entire freshman class travels to Washington, D.C. for an experiential learning trip known as Experience DC. During the trip, students visit offices of legislators, national museums, international organizations, art galleries and various public venues.  Participants are challenged to explore their views on the arts, religion, varying cultures and issues facing humankind.  The trip also helps students examine career options.

Institutes of King University
Institute of Security and Intelligence Studies.
The King Institute for Security and Intelligence Studies (KISIS) is a nonprofit, nonpartisan organization dedicated to the scholarly study and advancement of security and intelligence issues.

Institute for Regional and Economic Studies.
The King Institute for Regional Economic Studies (KIRES) was established in 2012 to expand the scope of the King University Regional Economic Studies (KCRES) team. A small KCRES team was formed in 2010 within King’s School of Business to provide analysis of economic problems and opportunities confronting the region served by King University.

Institute for Faith & Culture.
The King Institute aims to cultivate a conversation that is both artful and substantial on issues of Christian faith and culture, creating spaces for students and community members to find friendship and shared purpose.

Student life

Student government
The Student Government Association (SGA) is the formal representative entity for the student body, consisting of elected executive officers (President and Vice President) and a Senate representing each class (Freshman, Sophomore, Junior, and Senior). The SGA serves as the voice of the students to the board of trustees, administration, faculty, and staff. The SGA also charters, funds, and oversees other student organizations.

Student organizations
Academic organizations include: STEA-KE (Education), History & Political Science Society, Psy Chi Honor Society, Forensic Science Club, Marketing Club, Finance Club, ENACTUS (formerly SIFE), and a collegiate chapter of the Association for Computing Machinery.

Performing arts-related organizations include: Collegium Musicum (Chamber Choir), Symphonic Choir, Men's Ensemble (All the King's Men), Women's Ensemble (Queen's of King), Jazz/Gospel Choir, Symphonic Band, 250 Jazz (Combo Jazz Ensemble - plays at basketball games occasionally), Chapel Band, and The King University Players (K.U.P.)

General interest organizations include Alpha Phi Omega, the Newman Club, a collegiate chapter of the International Justice Mission, the International Student Organization, College Republicans, College Democrats, TISL, and a computer/video gaming club.

Student publications
Students have the opportunity to work in journalism and publishing. The Kayseean is the student newspaper. The Kayseean transitioned to an online format in 2019. The school yearbook is The Tornado.

Student activities
The Student Life Activities Committee at King (SLACK) is a student group responsible for organizing and executing student activities under the direction of the Director of Student Life.  Events in the past have included: concerts, dances, movies, outdoor adventures (canoeing, caving, ropes courses), overnight trips, International Fair, Oktoberfest, a late night exam breakfast, an end-of-the-year luau, Safe Spring Break promotion, and bingo nights.

A program of intramural sports, called SLACK Sports, is offered to students. Typical sports include: indoor soccer, flag football, volleyball, dodgeball, bowling, and ultimate frisbee. In addition, intramural video game tournaments, Texas Hold'em poker tournaments, chess tournaments, and board game nights are also held throughout the year.

Residence halls

King's campus offers separate men's and women's residence halls.  High-speed internet and cable television are available in the residence halls.

 Parks Hall: Parks Hall houses women and features a formal parlor, a casual lobby with big screen television as well as kitchenettes, laundry facilities, and a guest room. Parks is the only residence hall that does not have air conditioning.
 Liston Hall: Liston Hall is a five-story residence hall. The top three floors are generally referred to as Liston Hall. The first subfloor houses women and is referred to as the Lower Liston Hall. The second subfloor houses men and is known as the Liston Honors Suites. Liston contains laundry facilities, a guest room, and a central lobby on the main floor. All rooms are air-conditioned.
 Lower Liston Hall: Lower Liston Hall houses women and is located on the first subfloor of Liston Hall. Lower Liston is separated from the men's halls by a series of doors, which are closed at all times, and only accessible in case of emergency. Lower Liston Hall features free laundry facilities, kitchen, and a television lounge. All rooms are air-conditioned.
 Liston Honors Suites: Liston Honors Suites houses men and is located on the lowest level of Liston Hall. Those living in Liston Honors Suites are selected based on GPA, class standing, and personal commitment to upholding college policies. Liston Honors Suites contains free laundry facilities, a common area, and suite style-rooms with semi-private bathrooms. All rooms are air-conditioned.
 Mitchell Hall: Mitchell Hall is a townhouse-style residence hall for students located on the west part of campus. Each of the five units can house either men or women. Mitchell has generally housed women, but one or more units of housing men have been more common in recent years. Each Mitchell Hall unit has free laundry facilities and a television lounge. All rooms are air-conditioned.
 Hyde Honors Hall: Hyde Hall houses women and offers semi-private bathrooms shared by four suite mates. It contains free laundry facilities, a television lounge, a fully equipped kitchen, and a formal lobby.  Those living in Hyde are selected based on GPA, class standing, and personal commitment to upholding university policies.

Athletics

The King athletic teams are called the Tornado. The university is a member of the NCAA Division II ranks, primarily competing in the Conference Carolinas (CC) since the 2011–12 academic year. They were also a member of the National Christian College Athletic Association (NCCAA), primarily competing as an independent in the Mid-East Region of the Division I level. The Tornado previously competed as an NCAA D-II Independent from 2009 to 10 to 2010–11; and in the Appalachian Athletic Conference (AAC) of the National Association of Intercollegiate Athletics (NAIA) from 2001 to 02 to 2008–09.

King competes in 25 intercollegiate varsity sports: Men's sports include baseball, basketball, cross-country, golf, soccer, swimming & diving, tennis, track & field, volleyball and wrestling; while women's sports include acrobatics & tumbling, basketball, cross-country, golf, softball, soccer, swimming & diving, tennis, track & field, triathlon, volleyball and wrestling; and co-ed sports include bass fishing, cheerleading, cycling, dance and Esports.

University nickname
The university nickname, the Tornado, was adopted in 1922 following a 206–0 football win over North Carolina rival Lenoir College (now Lenoir–Rhyne University).  The local newspaper covering the event wrote the headline "King College's Victory Was 'Tornado' Of Week's Games" and began referring to the football team as the "Tornado".  This is a record score which stands in the annals of collegiate football as one of the highest ever won on the gridiron.

University mascot
Twister, a lion, was unveiled as the University's new mascot on September 2, 2011. Twister is a fearless lion that represents the determination and courage reflected in King's adventure as an NCAA Division II institution. Equipped with his King colors of navy blue and scarlet red, Twister dons the number 11 on his back while rallying those in Tornado Athletics and the King University community.

Spiritual life
Students have many opportunities to explore Christian beliefs and spiritual traditions.  Opportunities abound with chapel, the King Institute for Faith and Culture, Christian ministry groups, and service projects.  Each year, student teams also travel nationally and internationally for a range of mission and study abroad trips.

All traditional King students are required to obtain fourteen chapel, convocation, or community service credit hours per semester.

Chapel
Chapel is held every Wednesday at 9:15 a.m. and led by the Chaplain.

The King University Institute for Faith and Culture
Inaugurated in 2008 and dedicated to the work and example of Frederick Buechner, the Buechner Institute at King University explored the relationship between faith and culture. In 2015, after the death of Dr. Dale Brown, founding director, and at the request of the Buechner Literary Assets, LLC,  the Buechner Institute became the King Institute for Faith and Culture. The King Institute for Faith and Culture is a continuation of conversations between faith, art, and culture started by the Buechner Institute.

The King Institute for Faith and Culture sponsors on-campus convocations (generally on Mondays at 9:15 a.m.) as well as evening lectures either on campus or in community venues, that feature speakers from a variety of backgrounds to examine the ways in which faith informs art and public life and cultivate conversation about what faith has to do with books, politics, social discourse, music, visual arts, and more.

Notable alumni
Christian H. Cooper - author, trader, and member of the Council on Foreign Relations.
Patricia Cornwell - bestselling author
Cylk Cozart - actor
Rodney D. Fogg- General
Mike Helton - former president of NASCAR
Chad Keen - Mayor of Bristol, Tennessee 
William R. Laird, III - United States Senator from West Virginia
Jason Mumpower - former Tennessee State Representative
Katherine Paterson - author of Bridge to Terabithia and other children's novels

References

External links
 
 Official athletics website

 
Educational institutions established in 1867
Universities and colleges accredited by the Southern Association of Colleges and Schools
Education in Sullivan County, Tennessee
Buildings and structures in Sullivan County, Tennessee
1867 establishments in Tennessee
Council for Christian Colleges and Universities
Universities and colleges affiliated with the Presbyterian Church (USA)
Private universities and colleges in Tennessee